Werner Karl Heisenberg (5 December 1901 – 1 February 1976) was a German theoretical physicist and one of the main pioneers of the theory of quantum mechanics. He published his work in 1925 in a major breakthrough paper. In the subsequent series of papers with Max Born and Pascual Jordan, during the same year, his matrix formulation of quantum mechanics was substantially elaborated. He is known for the uncertainty principle, which he published in 1927. Heisenberg was awarded the 1932 Nobel Prize in Physics "for the creation of quantum mechanics".

Heisenberg also made contributions to the theories of the hydrodynamics of turbulent flows, the atomic nucleus, ferromagnetism, cosmic rays, and subatomic particles. He was a principal scientist in the German nuclear weapons program during World War II. He was also instrumental in planning the first West German nuclear reactor at Karlsruhe, together with a research reactor in Munich, in 1957.

Following World War II, he was appointed director of the Kaiser Wilhelm Institute for Physics, which soon thereafter was renamed the Max Planck Institute for Physics. He was director of the institute until it was moved to Munich in 1958. He then became director of the Max Planck Institute for Physics and Astrophysics from 1960 to 1970.

Heisenberg was also president of the German Research Council, chairman of the Commission for Atomic Physics, chairman of the Nuclear Physics Working Group, and president of the Alexander von Humboldt Foundation.

Early life and education

Early years
Werner Karl Heisenberg was born in Würzburg, Germany, to Kaspar Ernst August Heisenberg, and his wife, Annie Wecklein. His father was a secondary school teacher of classical languages who became Germany's only ordentlicher Professor (ordinarius professor) of medieval and modern Greek studies in the university system.

Heisenberg was raised and lived as a Lutheran Christian. In his late teenage years, Heisenberg read Plato's Timaeus while hiking in the Bavarian Alps. He recounted philosophical conversations with his fellow students and teachers about understanding the atom while receiving his scientific training in Munich, Göttingen and Copenhagen. Heisenberg later stated that "My mind was formed by studying philosophy, Plato and that sort of thing". and that "Modern physics has definitely decided in favor of Plato. In fact the smallest units of matter are not physical objects in the ordinary sense; they are forms, ideas which can be expressed unambiguously only in mathematical language".

In 1919 Heisenberg arrived in Munich as a member of the Freikorps to fight the Bavarian Soviet Republic established a year earlier. Five decades later he recalled those days as youthful fun, like "playing cops and robbers and so on; it was nothing serious at all;" his duties were restricted to "seizing bicycles or typewriters from 'red' administrative buildings", and guarding suspected "red" prisoners.

University studies

From 1920 to 1923, he studied physics and mathematics at the Ludwig Maximilian University of Munich under Arnold Sommerfeld and Wilhelm Wien and at the Georg-August University of Göttingen with Max Born and James Franck and mathematics with David Hilbert. He received his doctorate in 1923 at Munich under Sommerfeld.

At Göttingen, under Born, he completed his habilitation in 1924 with a Habilitationsschrift (habilitation thesis) on the anomalous Zeeman effect.

In June 1922, Sommerfeld took Heisenberg to Göttingen to attend the Bohr Festival, because Sommerfeld had a sincere interest in his students and knew of Heisenberg's interest in Niels Bohr's theories on atomic physics. At the event, Bohr was a guest lecturer and gave a series of comprehensive lectures on quantum atomic physics and Heisenberg met Bohr for the first time, which had a lasting effect on him.

Heisenberg's doctoral thesis, the topic of which was suggested by Sommerfeld, was on turbulence; the thesis discussed both the stability of laminar flow and the nature of turbulent flow. The problem of stability was investigated by the use of the Orr–Sommerfeld equation, a fourth order linear differential equation for small disturbances from laminar flow. He briefly returned to this topic after World War II.

In his youth he was a member and Scoutleader of the Neupfadfinder, a German Scout association and part of the German Youth Movement. In August 1923 Robert Honsell and Heisenberg organized a trip to Finland with a Scout group of this association from Munich.

Personal life
Heisenberg enjoyed classical music and was an accomplished pianist. His interest in music led to meeting his future wife. In January 1937, Heisenberg met Elisabeth Schumacher (1914–1998) at a private music recital. Elisabeth was the daughter of a well-known Berlin economics professor, and her brother was the economist E. F. Schumacher, author of Small Is Beautiful. Heisenberg married her on 29 April. Fraternal twins Maria and Wolfgang were born in January 1938, whereupon Wolfgang Pauli congratulated Heisenberg on his "pair creation"—a word play on a process from elementary particle physics, pair production. They had five more children over the next 12 years: Barbara, Christine, Jochen, Martin and Verena. In 1936 he bought a summer home for his family in Urfeld am Walchensee, in southern Germany.

Academic career

Göttingen, Copenhagen and Leipzig
From 1924 to 1927, Heisenberg was a Privatdozent at Göttingen, meaning he was qualified to teach and examine independently, without having a chair. From 17 September 1924 to 1 May 1925, under an International Education Board Rockefeller Foundation fellowship, Heisenberg went to do research with Niels Bohr, director of the Institute of Theoretical Physics at the University of Copenhagen. His seminal paper, "Über quantentheoretische Umdeutung kinematischer und mechanischer Beziehungen" ("Quantum theoretical re-interpretation of kinematic and mechanical relations"), was published in September 1925. He returned to Göttingen and, with Max Born and Pascual Jordan over a period of about six months, developed the matrix mechanics formulation of quantum mechanics. On 1 May 1926, Heisenberg began his appointment as a university lecturer and assistant to Bohr in Copenhagen. It was in Copenhagen, in 1927, that Heisenberg developed his uncertainty principle, while working on the mathematical foundations of quantum mechanics. On 23 February, Heisenberg wrote a letter to fellow physicist Wolfgang Pauli, in which he first described his new principle. In his paper on the principle, Heisenberg used the word "Ungenauigkeit" (imprecision), not uncertainty, to describe it.

In 1927, Heisenberg was appointed ordentlicher Professor (professor ordinarius) of theoretical physics and head of the department of physics at the University of Leipzig; he gave his inaugural lecture there on 1 February 1928. In his first paper published from Leipzig, Heisenberg used the Pauli exclusion principle to solve the mystery of ferromagnetism.

During Heisenberg's tenure at Leipzig, the high quality of the doctoral students and post-graduate and research associates who studied and worked with him is clear from the acclaim many later earned. At various times they included Erich Bagge, Felix Bloch, Ugo Fano, Siegfried Flügge, William Vermillion Houston, Friedrich Hund, Robert S. Mulliken, Rudolf Peierls, George Placzek, Isidor Isaac Rabi, Fritz Sauter, John C. Slater, Edward Teller, John Hasbrouck van Vleck, Victor Frederick Weisskopf, Carl Friedrich von Weizsäcker, Gregor Wentzel, and Clarence Zener.

In early 1929, Heisenberg and Pauli submitted the first of two papers laying the foundation for relativistic quantum field theory. Also in 1929, Heisenberg went on a lecture tour of China, Japan, India, and the United States. In the spring of 1929, he was a visiting lecturer at the University of Chicago, where he lectured on quantum mechanics.

In 1928, the British mathematical physicist Paul Dirac had derived his relativistic wave equation of quantum mechanics, which implied the existence of positive electrons, later to be named positrons. In 1932, from a cloud chamber photograph of cosmic rays, the American physicist Carl David Anderson identified a track as having been made by a positron. In mid-1933, Heisenberg presented his theory of the positron. His thinking on Dirac's theory and further development of the theory were set forth in two papers. The first, "Bemerkungen zur Diracschen Theorie des Positrons" ("Remarks on Dirac's theory of the positron") was published in 1934, and the second, "Folgerungen aus der Diracschen Theorie des Positrons" ("Consequences of Dirac's Theory of the Positron"), was published in 1936. In these papers Heisenberg was the first to reinterpret the Dirac equation as a "classical" field equation for any point particle of spin ħ/2, itself subject to quantization conditions involving anti-commutators. Thus reinterpreting it as a (quantum) field equation accurately describing electrons, Heisenberg put matter on the same footing as electromagnetism: as being described by relativistic quantum field equations which allowed the possibility of particle creation and destruction. (Hermann Weyl had already described this in a 1929 letter to Albert Einstein.)

Matrix mechanics and the Nobel Prize

Heisenberg's paper establishing quantum mechanics has puzzled physicists and historians. His methods assume that the reader is familiar with Kramers-Heisenberg transition probability calculations. The main new idea, non-commuting matrices, is justified only by a rejection of unobservable quantities. It introduces the non-commutative multiplication of matrices by physical reasoning, based on the correspondence principle, despite the fact that Heisenberg was not then familiar with the mathematical theory of matrices. The path leading to these results has been reconstructed in MacKinnon, 1977, and the detailed calculations are worked out in Aitchison et al.

In Copenhagen, Heisenberg and Hans Kramers collaborated on a paper on dispersion, or the scattering from atoms of radiation whose wavelength is larger than the atoms. They showed that the successful formula Kramers had developed earlier could not be based on Bohr orbits, because the transition frequencies are based on level spacings which are not constant. The frequencies which occur in the Fourier transform of sharp classical orbits, by contrast, are equally spaced. But these results could be explained by a semi-classical virtual state model: the incoming radiation excites the valence, or outer, electron to a virtual state from which it decays. In a subsequent paper Heisenberg showed that this virtual oscillator model could also explain the polarization of fluorescent radiation.

These two successes, and the continuing failure of the Bohr–Sommerfeld model to explain the outstanding problem of the anomalous Zeeman effect, led Heisenberg to use the virtual oscillator model to try to calculate spectral frequencies. The method proved too difficult to immediately apply to realistic problems, so Heisenberg turned to a simpler example, the anharmonic oscillator.

The dipole oscillator consists of a simple harmonic oscillator, which is thought of as a charged particle on a spring, perturbed by an external force, like an external charge. The motion of the oscillating charge can be expressed as a Fourier series in the frequency of the oscillator. Heisenberg solved for the quantum behavior by two different methods. First, he treated the system with the virtual oscillator method, calculating the transitions between the levels that would be produced by the external source.

He then solved the same problem by treating the anharmonic potential term as a perturbation to the harmonic oscillator and using the perturbation methods that he and Born had developed. Both methods led to the same results for the first and the very complicated second order correction terms. This suggested that behind the very complicated calculations lay a consistent scheme.

So Heisenberg set out to formulate these results without any explicit dependence on the virtual oscillator model. To do this, he replaced the Fourier expansions for the spatial coordinates by matrices, matrices which corresponded to the transition coefficients in the virtual oscillator method. He justified this replacement by an appeal to Bohr's correspondence principle and the Pauli doctrine that quantum mechanics must be limited to observables.

On 9 July, Heisenberg gave Born this paper to review and submit for publication. When Born read the paper, he recognized the formulation as one which could be transcribed and extended to the systematic language of matrices, which he had learned from his study under Jakob Rosanes at Breslau University. Born, with the help of his assistant and former student Pascual Jordan, began immediately to make the transcription and extension, and they submitted their results for publication; the paper was received for publication just 60 days after Heisenberg's paper. A follow-on paper was submitted for publication before the end of the year by all three authors.

Up until this time, matrices were seldom used by physicists; they were considered to belong to the realm of pure mathematics. Gustav Mie had used them in a paper on electrodynamics in 1912 and Born had used them in his work on the lattice theory of crystals in 1921. While matrices were used in these cases, the algebra of matrices with their multiplication did not enter the picture as they did in the matrix formulation of quantum mechanics.

In 1928, Albert Einstein nominated Heisenberg, Born, and Jordan for the Nobel Prize in Physics, The announcement of the Nobel Prize in Physics for 1932 was delayed until November 1933. It was at that time that it was announced Heisenberg had won the Prize for 1932 "for the creation of quantum mechanics, the application of which has, inter alia, led to the discovery of the allotropic forms of hydrogen".

Interpretation of quantum theory

The  development of quantum mechanics, and the apparent contradictory implications in regard to what is "real" had profound philosophical implications, including what scientific observations truly mean. In contrast to Albert Einstein and Louis de Broglie, who were realists who believed that particles had an objectively true momentum and position at all times (even if both could not be measured), Heisenberg was an anti-realist, arguing that direct knowledge of what is "real" was beyond the scope of science. Writing in his book The Physicist's Conception of Nature, Heisenberg argued that ultimately we only can speak of the knowledge (numbers in tables) which describe something about particles but we can never have any "true" access to the particles themselves:We can no longer speak of the behaviour of the particle independently of the process of observation. As a final consequence, the natural laws formulated mathematically in quantum theory no longer deal with the elementary particles themselves but with our knowledge of them. Nor is it any longer possible to ask whether or not these particles exist in space and time objectively ...

When we speak of the picture of nature in the exact science of our age, we do not mean a picture of nature so much as a picture of our relationships with nature. ...Science no longer confronts nature as an objective observer, but sees itself as an actor in this interplay between man and nature. The scientific method of analysing, explaining and classifying has become conscious of its limitations, which arise out of the fact that by its intervention science alters and refashions the object of investigation. In other words, method and object can no longer be separated.

SS investigation
Shortly after the discovery of the neutron by James Chadwick in 1932, Heisenberg submitted the first of three papers on his neutron-proton model of the nucleus. After Adolf Hitler came to power in 1933, Heisenberg was attacked in the press as a "White Jew" (i.e. an Aryan who acts like a Jew). Supporters of Deutsche Physik, or German Physics (also known as Aryan Physics), launched vicious attacks against leading theoretical physicists, including Arnold Sommerfeld and Heisenberg. From the early 1930s onward, the anti-Semitic and anti-theoretical physics movement Deutsche Physik had concerned itself with quantum mechanics and the theory of relativity. As applied in the university environment, political factors took priority over scholarly ability, even though its two most prominent supporters were the Nobel Laureates in Physics Philipp Lenard and Johannes Stark.

There had been many failed attempts to have Heisenberg appointed as professor at a number of German universities. His attempt to be appointed as successor to Arnold Sommerfeld failed because of opposition by the Deutsche Physik movement. On 1 April 1935, the eminent theoretical physicist Sommerfeld, Heisenberg's doctoral advisor at the Ludwig-Maximilians-Universität München, achieved emeritus status. However, Sommerfeld stayed in his chair during the selection process for his successor, which took until 1 December 1939. The process was lengthy due to academic and political differences between the Munich Faculty's selection and that of the Reich Education Ministry and the supporters of Deutsche Physik.

In 1935, the Munich Faculty drew up a list of candidates to replace Sommerfeld as ordinarius professor of theoretical physics and head of the Institute for Theoretical Physics at the University of Munich. The three candidates had all been former students of Sommerfeld: Heisenberg, who had received the Nobel Prize in Physics; Peter Debye, who had received the Nobel Prize in Chemistry in 1936; and Richard Becker. The Munich Faculty was firmly behind these candidates, with Heisenberg as their first choice. However, supporters of Deutsche Physik and elements in the REM had their own list of candidates, and the battle dragged on for over four years. During this time, Heisenberg came under vicious attack by the Deutsche Physik supporters. One attack was published in Das Schwarze Korps, the newspaper of the SS, headed by Heinrich Himmler. In this, Heisenberg was called a "White Jew" who should be made to "disappear". These attacks were taken seriously, as Jews were violently attacked and incarcerated. Heisenberg fought back with an editorial and a letter to Himmler, in an attempt to resolve the matter and regain his honour.

At one point, Heisenberg's mother visited Himmler's mother. The two women knew each other, as Heisenberg's maternal grandfather and Himmler's father were rectors and members of a Bavarian hiking club. Eventually, Himmler settled the Heisenberg affair by sending two letters, one to SS Gruppenführer Reinhard Heydrich and one to Heisenberg, both on 21 July 1938. In the letter to Heydrich, Himmler said Germany could not afford to lose or silence Heisenberg, as he would be useful for teaching a generation of scientists. To Heisenberg, Himmler said the letter came on recommendation of his family and he cautioned Heisenberg to make a distinction between professional physics research results and the personal and political attitudes of the involved scientists.

Wilhelm Müller replaced Sommerfeld at the Ludwig Maximilian University of Munich. Müller was not a theoretical physicist, had not published in a physics journal, and was not a member of the German Physical Society. His appointment was considered a travesty and detrimental to educating theoretical physicists.

The three investigators who led the SS investigation of Heisenberg had training in physics. Indeed, Heisenberg had participated in the doctoral examination of one of them at the Universität Leipzig. The most influential of the three was Johannes Juilfs. During their investigation, they became supporters of Heisenberg as well as his position against the ideological policies of the Deutsche Physik movement in theoretical physics and academia.

German nuclear weapons program

Pre-war work on physics
In mid-1936, Heisenberg presented his theory of cosmic-ray showers in two papers. Four more papers appeared in the next two years.

In December 1938, the German chemists Otto Hahn and Fritz Strassmann sent a manuscript to The Natural Sciences reporting they had detected the element barium after bombarding uranium with neutrons and Otto Hahn concluded a bursting of the uranium nucleus; simultaneously, Hahn communicated these results to his friend Lise Meitner, who had in July of that year fled to the Netherlands and then went to Sweden. Meitner, and her nephew Otto Robert Frisch, correctly interpreted Hahn's and Strassmann's results as being nuclear fission. Frisch confirmed this experimentally on 13 January 1939.

In June 1939, Heisenberg traveled to the United States in June and July, visiting Samuel Abraham Goudsmit at the University of Michigan in Ann Arbor. However, Heisenberg refused an invitation to emigrate to the United States. He did not see Goudsmit again until six years later, when Goudsmit was the chief scientific advisor to the American Operation Alsos at the close of World War II.

Membership in the Uranverein
The German nuclear weapons program, known as Uranverein, was formed on 1 September 1939, the day World War II began. The Heereswaffenamt (HWA, Army Ordnance Office) had squeezed the Reichsforschungsrat (RFR, Reich Research Council) out of the Reichserziehungsministerium (REM, Reich Ministry of Education) and started the formal German nuclear energy project under military auspices. The project had its first meeting on 16 September 1939. The meeting was organized by Kurt Diebner, advisor to the HWA, and held in Berlin. The invitees included Walther Bothe, Siegfried Flügge, Hans Geiger, Otto Hahn, Paul Harteck, Gerhard Hoffmann, Josef Mattauch and Georg Stetter. A second meeting was held soon thereafter and included Heisenberg, Klaus Clusius, Robert Döpel and Carl Friedrich von Weizsäcker. The Kaiser-Wilhelm Institut für Physik (KWIP, Kaiser Wilhelm Institute for Physics) in Berlin-Dahlem, was placed under HWA authority, with Diebner as the administrative director, and the military control of the nuclear research commenced. During the period when Diebner administered the KWIP under the HWA program, considerable personal and professional animosity developed between Diebner and Heisenberg's inner circle, which included Karl Wirtz and Carl Friedrich von Weizsäcker.

At a scientific conference on 26–28 February 1942 at the Kaiser Wilhelm Institute for Physics, called by the Army Weapons Office, Heisenberg presented a lecture to Reichs officials on energy acquisition from nuclear fission. The lecture, entitled "Die theoretischen Grundlagen für die Energiegewinnung aus der Uranspaltung" ("The theoretical basis for energy generation from uranium fission") was, as Heisenberg confessed after the Second World War in a letter to Samuel Goudsmit, "adapted to the intellectual level of a Reichs Minister". Heisenberg lectured on the enormous energy potential of nuclear fission, stating that 250 million electron volts could be released through the fission of an atomic nucleus. Heisenberg stressed that pure U-235 had to be obtained to achieve a chain reaction. He explored various ways of obtaining isotope  in its pure form, including uranium enrichment and an alternative layered method of normal uranium and a moderator in a machine. This machine, he noted, could be used in practical ways to fuel vehicles, ships and submarines. Heisenberg stressed the importance of the Army Weapons Office's financial and material support for this scientific endeavour. A second scientific conference followed. Lectures were heard on problems of modern physics with decisive importance for the national defense and economy. The conference was attended by Bernhard Rust, the Reichs Minister of Science, Education and National Culture. At the conference Reichs Minister Rust decided to take the nuclear project away from the Kaiser Wilhelm Society. The Reichs Research Council was to take on the project. In April 1942 the army returned the Physics Institute to the Kaiser Wilhelm Society, naming Heisenberg as Director at the Institute. With this appointment at the KWIP, Heisenberg obtained his first professorship. Peter Debye was still director of the institute, but had gone on leave to the United States after he had refused to become a German citizen when the HWA took administrative control of the KWIP. Heisenberg still also had his department of physics at the University of Leipzig where work had been done for the Uranverein by Robert Döpel and his wife Klara Döpel.

On 4 June 1942, Heisenberg was summoned to report to Albert Speer, Germany's Minister of Armaments, on the prospects for converting the Uranverein's research toward developing nuclear weapons. During the meeting, Heisenberg told Speer that a bomb could not be built before 1945, because it would require significant monetary resources and number of personnel.

After the Uranverein project was placed under the leadership of the Reichs Research Council, it focused on nuclear power production and thus maintained its kriegswichtig (importance for the war) status; funding therefore continued from the military. The nuclear power project was broken down into the following main areas: uranium and heavy water production, uranium isotope separation and the Uranmaschine (uranium machine, i.e., nuclear reactor). The project was then essentially split up between a number of institutes, where the directors dominated the research and set their own research agendas. The point in 1942, when the army relinquished its control of the German nuclear weapons program, was the zenith of the project relative to the number of personnel. About 70 scientists worked for the program, with about 40 devoting more than half their time to nuclear fission research. After 1942, the number of scientists working on applied nuclear fission diminished dramatically. Many of the scientists not working with the main institutes stopped working on nuclear fission and devoted their efforts to more pressing war-related work.

In September 1942, Heisenberg submitted his first paper of a three-part series on the scattering matrix, or S-matrix, in elementary particle physics. The first two papers were published in 1943 and the third in 1944. The S-matrix described only the states of incident particles in a collision process, the states of those emerging from the collision, and stable bound states; there would be no reference to the intervening states. This was the same precedent as he followed in 1925 in what turned out to be the foundation of the matrix formulation of quantum mechanics through only the use of observables.

In February 1943, Heisenberg was appointed to the Chair for Theoretical Physics at the Friedrich-Wilhelms-Universität (today, the Humboldt-Universität zu Berlin). In April, his election to the Preußische Akademie der Wissenschaften (Prussian Academy of Sciences) was approved. That same month, he moved his family to their retreat in Urfeld as Allied bombing increased in Berlin. In the summer, he dispatched the first of his staff at the Kaiser-Wilhelm Institut für Physik to Hechingen and its neighboring town of Haigerloch, on the edge of the Black Forest, for the same reasons. From 18–26 October, he travelled to German-occupied Netherlands. In December 1943, Heisenberg visited German-occupied Poland.

From 24 January to 4 February 1944, Heisenberg travelled to occupied Copenhagen, after the German army confiscated Bohr's Institute of Theoretical Physics. He made a short return trip in April. In December, Heisenberg lectured in neutral Switzerland. The United States Office of Strategic Services sent agent Moe Berg to attend the lecture carrying a pistol, with orders to shoot Heisenberg if his lecture indicated that Germany was close to completing an atomic bomb.

In January 1945, Heisenberg, with most of the rest of his staff, moved from the Kaiser-Wilhelm Institut für Physik to the facilities in the Black Forest.

Post-Second World War

1945: Alsos Mission

The Alsos Mission was an Allied effort to determine if the Germans had an atomic bomb program and to exploit German atomic related facilities, research, material resources, and scientific personnel for the benefit of the US. Personnel on this operation generally swept into areas which had just come under control of the Allied military forces, but sometimes they operated in areas still under control by German forces. Berlin had been a location of many German scientific research facilities. To limit casualties and loss of equipment, many of these facilities were dispersed to other locations in the latter years of the war. The Kaiser-Wilhelm-Institut für Physik (KWIP, Kaiser Wilhelm Institute for Physics) had been bombed so it had mostly been moved in 1943 and 1944 to Hechingen and its neighboring town of Haigerloch, on the edge of the Black Forest, which eventually became included in the French occupation zone. This allowed the American task force of the Alsos Mission to take into custody a large number of German scientists associated with nuclear research.

On 30 March, the Alsos Mission reached Heidelberg, where important scientists were captured including Walther Bothe, Richard Kuhn, Philipp Lenard, and Wolfgang Gertner. Their interrogation revealed that Otto Hahn was at his laboratory in Tailfingen, while Heisenberg and Max von Laue were at Heisenberg's laboratory in Hechingen, and that the experimental natural uranium reactor that Heisenberg's team had built in Berlin had been moved to Haigerloch. Thereafter, the main focus of the Alsos Mission was on these nuclear facilities in the Württemberg area. Heisenberg was smuggled out from Urfeld, on 3 May 1945, in an alpine operation in territory still under control by elite German forces. He was taken to Heidelberg, where, on 5 May, he met Goudsmit for the first time since the Ann Arbor visit in 1939. Germany surrendered just two days later. Heisenberg would not see his family again for eight months, as he was moved across France and Belgium and flown to England on 3 July 1945.

1945: Reaction to Hiroshima
Nine of the prominent German scientists who published reports in Nuclear Physics Research Reports as members of the Uranverein were captured by Operation Alsos and incarcerated in England under Operation Epsilon. Ten German scientists, including Heisenberg, were held at Farm Hall in England. The facility had been a safe house of the British foreign intelligence MI6. During their detention, their conversations were recorded. Conversations thought to be of intelligence value were transcribed and translated into English. The transcripts were released in 1992. On 6 August 1945, the scientists at Farm Hall learned from media reports that the USA had dropped an atomic bomb in Hiroshima, Japan. At first, there was disbelief that a bomb had been built and dropped. In the weeks that followed, the German scientists discussed how the USA might have built the bomb.

The Farm Hall transcripts reveal that Heisenberg, along with other physicists interned at Farm Hall including Otto Hahn and Carl Friedrich von Weizsäcker, were glad the Allies had won World War II. Heisenberg told other scientists that he had never contemplated a bomb, only an atomic pile to produce energy. The morality of creating a bomb for the Nazis was also discussed. Only a few of the scientists expressed genuine horror at the prospect of nuclear weapons, and Heisenberg himself was cautious in discussing the matter. On the failure of the German nuclear weapons program to build an atomic bomb, Heisenberg remarked, "We wouldn't have had the moral courage to recommend to the government in the spring of 1942 that they should employ 120,000 men just for building the thing up."

Post-war research career

Executive positions at German research institutions
On 3 January 1946, the ten Operation Epsilon detainees were transported to Alswede in Germany. Heisenberg settled in Göttingen, which was in the British zone of Allied-occupied Germany. Heisenberg immediately began to promote scientific research in Germany. Following the Kaiser Wilhelm Society's obliteration by the Allied Control Council and the establishment of the Max Planck Society in the British zone, Heisenberg became the director of the Max Planck Institute for Physics. Max von Laue was appointed vice director, while Karl Wirtz, Carl Friedrich von Weizsäcker and Ludwig Biermann joined to help Heisenberg establish the institute. Heinz Billing joined in 1950 to promote the development of electronic computing. The core research focus of the institute was cosmic radiation. The institute held a colloquium every Saturday morning.

Heisenberg envisaged for this council to promote the dialogue between the newly founded Federal Republic of Germany and the scientific community based in Germany. Heisenberg was appointed president of the Forschungsrat. In 1951, the organization was fused with the Notgemeinschaft der Deutschen Wissenschaft (Emergency Association of German Science) and that same year renamed the Deutsche Forschungsgemeinschaft (German Research Foundation). Following the merger, Heisenberg was appointed to the presidium.

In 1958, the Max-Planck-Institut für Physik was moved to Munich, expanded, and renamed Max-Planck-Institut für Physik und Astrophysik (MPIFA). In the interim, Heisenberg and the astrophysicist Ludwig Biermann were co-directors of MPIFA. Heisenberg also became an ordentlicher Professor (ordinarius professor) at the Ludwig-Maximilians-Universität München. Heisenberg was the sole director of MPIFA from 1960 to 1970. Heisenberg resigned his directorship of the MPIFA on 31 December 1970.

Promotion of international scientific cooperation
In 1951, Heisenberg agreed to become the scientific representative of the Federal Republic of Germany at the UNESCO conference, with the aim of establishing a European laboratory for nuclear physics. Heisenberg's aim was to build a large particle accelerator, drawing on the resources and technical skills of scientists across the Western Bloc. On 1 July 1953 Heisenberg signed the convention that established CERN on behalf of the Federal Republic of Germany. Although he was asked to become CERN's founding scientific director, he declined. Instead, he was appointed chair of CERN's science policy committee and went on to determine the scientific program at CERN.

In December 1953, Heisenberg became the president of the Alexander von Humboldt Foundation. During his tenure as president 550 Humboldt scholars from 78 nations received scientific research grants. Heisenberg resigned as president shortly before his death.

Research interests
In 1946, the German scientist Heinz Pose, head of Laboratory V in Obninsk, wrote a letter to Heisenberg inviting him to work in the USSR. The letter lauded the working conditions in the USSR and the available resources, as well as the favorable attitude of the Soviets towards German scientists. A courier hand delivered the recruitment letter, dated 18 July 1946, to Heisenberg; Heisenberg politely declined. In 1947, Heisenberg presented lectures in Cambridge, Edinburgh and Bristol. Heisenberg contributed to the understanding of the phenomenon of superconductivity with a paper in 1947 and two papers in 1948, one of them with Max von Laue.

In the period shortly after World War II, Heisenberg briefly returned to the subject of his doctoral thesis, turbulence. Three papers were published in 1948 and one in 1950. In the post-war period Heisenberg continued his interests in cosmic-ray showers with considerations on multiple production of mesons. He published three papers in 1949, two in 1952, and one in 1955.

In late 1955 to early 1956, Heisenberg gave the Gifford Lectures at St Andrews University, in Scotland, on the intellectual history of physics. The lectures were later published as Physics and Philosophy: The Revolution in Modern Science. During 1956 and 1957, Heisenberg was the chairman of the Arbeitskreis Kernphysik (Nuclear Physics Working Group) of the Fachkommission II "Forschung und Nachwuchs" (Commission II "Research and Growth") of the Deutsche Atomkommission (DAtK, German Atomic Energy Commission). Other members of the Nuclear Physics Working Group in both 1956 and 1957 were: Walther Bothe, Hans Kopfermann (vice-chairman), Fritz Bopp, Wolfgang Gentner, Otto Haxel, Willibald Jentschke, Heinz Maier-Leibnitz, Josef Mattauch, Wilhelm Walcher and Carl Friedrich von Weizsäcker. Wolfgang Paul was also a member of the group during 1957.

In 1957, Heisenberg was a signatory of the Göttinger Manifest, taking a public stand against the Federal Republic of Germany arming itself with nuclear weapons. Heisenberg, like Pascual Jordan, thought politicians would ignore this statement by nuclear scientists. But Heisenberg believed that the Göttinger Manifest would "influence public opinion" which politicians would have to take into account. He wrote to Walther Gerlach: "We will probably have to keep coming back to this question in public for a long time because of the danger that public opinion will slacken." In 1961 Heisenberg signed the Memorandum of Tübingen alongside a group of scientists who had been brought together by Carl Friedrich von Weizsäcker and Ludwig Raiser. A public discussion between scientists and politicians ensued. As prominent politicians, authors and socialites joined the debate on nuclear weapons, the signatories of the memorandum took a stand against "the full-time intellectual nonconformists".

From 1957 onwards, Heisenberg was interested in plasma physics and the process of nuclear fusion. He also collaborated with the International Institute of Atomic Physics in Geneva. He was a member of the Institute's scientific policy committee, and for several years was the Committee's chair. He was one of the eight signatories of the Memorandum of Tübingen which called for the recognition of the Oder–Neiße line as the official border between Germany and Poland and spoke against a possible nuclear armament of West Germany.

In 1973, Heisenberg gave a lecture at Harvard University on the historical development of the concepts of quantum theory. On 24 March 1973 Heisenberg gave a speech before the Catholic Academy of Bavaria, accepting the Romano Guardini Prize. An English translation of his speech was published under the title "Scientific and Religious Truth", a quotation from which appears in a later section of this article.

Philosophy and worldview
Heisenberg admired Eastern philosophy and saw parallels between it and quantum mechanics, describing himself as in "complete agreement" with the book The Tao of Physics. Heisenberg even went as far to state that after conversations with Rabindranath Tagore about Indian philosophy "some of the ideas that seemed so crazy suddenly made much more sense".

Regarding the philosophy of Ludwig Wittgenstein, Heisenberg disliked Tractatus Logico-Philosophicus but he liked "very much the later ideas of Wittgenstein and his philosophy about language."

Heisenberg, a devout Christian, wrote: "We can console ourselves that the good Lord God would know the position of the [subatomic] particles, thus He would let the causality principle continue to have validity", in his last letter to Albert Einstein. Einstein continued to maintain that quantum physics must be incomplete because it implies that the universe is indeterminate at a fundamental level.

In lectures given in the 1950s and later published as Physics and Philosophy, Heisenberg contended that scientific advances were leading to cultural conflicts. He stated that modern physics is "part of a general historical process that tends toward a unification and a widening of our present world".

He mused:

Autobiography and death
Heisenberg's son, Martin Heisenberg, became a neurobiologist at the University of Würzburg, while his son Jochen Heisenberg became a physics professor at the University of New Hampshire.

In his late sixties, Heisenberg penned his autobiography for the mass market. In 1969 the book was published in Germany, in early 1971 it was published in English and in the years thereafter in a string of other languages. Heisenberg had initiated the project in 1966, when his public lectures increasingly turned to the subjects of philosophy and religion. Heisenberg had sent the manuscript for a textbook on the unified field theory to the Hirzel Verlag and John Wiley & Sons for publication. This manuscript, he wrote to one of his publishers, was the preparatory work for his autobiography. He structured his autobiography in themes, covering: 1) The goal of exact science, 2) The problematic of language in atomic physics, 3) Abstraction in mathematics and science, 4) The divisibility of matter or Kant's antinomy, 5) The basic symmetry and its substantiation, and 6) Science and religion.

Heisenberg wrote his memoirs as a chain of conversations, covering the course of his life. The book became a popular success, but was regarded as troublesome by historians of science. In the preface Heisenberg wrote that he had abridged historical events, to make them more concise. At the time of publication it was reviewed by Paul Forman in the journal Science with the comment "Now here is a memoir in the form of rationally reconstructed dialogue. And the dialogue as Galileo well knew, is itself a most insidious literary device: lively, entertaining, and especially suited for insinuating opinions while yet evading responsibility for them." Few scientific memoirs had been published, but Konrad Lorenz and Adolf Portmann had penned popular books that conveyed scholarship to a wide audience. Heisenberg worked on his autobiography and published it with the Piper Verlag in Munich. Heisenberg initially proposed the title Gespräche im Umkreis der Atomphysik (Conversations on atomic physics). The autobiography was published eventually under the title Der Teil und das Ganze (The part and the whole). The 1971 English translation was published under the title Physics and Beyond: Encounters and Conversations.

Heisenberg died of kidney cancer at his home, on 1 February 1976. The next evening, his colleagues and friends walked in remembrance from the Institute of Physics to his home, lit a candle and placed it in front of his door. Heisenberg is buried in Munich Waldfriedhof.

In 1980 his widow, Elisabeth Heisenberg, published The Political Life of an Apolitical Person (de, Das politische Leben eines Unpolitischen). In it she characterized Heisenberg as "first and foremost, a spontaneous person, thereafter a brilliant scientist, next a highly talented artist, and only in the fourth place, from a sense of duty, homo politicus."

Honors and awards
Heisenberg was awarded a number of honors:
 Honorary doctorates from the University of Brussels, the Technological University of Karlsruhe, and Eötvös Loránd University.
 Bavarian Order of Merit
 Romano Guardini Prize
 Grand Cross for Federal Service with Star
 Knight of the Order of Merit (Civil Class)
 Elected a Foreign Member of the Royal Society (ForMemRS) in 1955
 Member of the Academies of Sciences of Göttingen, Bavaria, Saxony, Prussia, Sweden, Romania, Norway, Spain, The Netherlands (1939), Rome (Pontifical), the Deutsche Akademie der Naturforscher Leopoldina (Halle), the Accademia dei Lincei (Rome), and the American Academy of Sciences.
 1932 – Nobel Prize in Physics "for the creation of quantum mechanics, the application of which has, inter alia, led to the discovery of the allotropic forms of hydrogen".
 1933 – Max-Planck-Medaille of the Deutsche Physikalische Gesellschaft

Research reports on nuclear physics
The following reports were published in Kernphysikalische Forschungsberichte (Research Reports in Nuclear Physics), an internal publication of the German Uranverein. The reports were classified Top Secret, they had very limited distribution, and the authors were not allowed to keep copies. The reports were confiscated under the Allied Operation Alsos and sent to the United States Atomic Energy Commission for evaluation. In 1971, the reports were declassified and returned to Germany. The reports are available at the Karlsruhe Nuclear Research Center and the American Institute of Physics.
 Werner Heisenberg Die Möglichkeit der technischer Energiegewinnung aus der Uranspaltung G-39 (6 December 1939)
 Werner Heisenberg Bericht über die Möglichkeit technischer Energiegewinnung aus der Uranspaltung (II) G-40 (29 February 1940)
 Robert Döpel, K. Döpel, and Werner Heisenberg Bestimmung der Diffusionslänge thermischer Neutronen in schwerem Wasser G-23 (7 August 1940)
Robert Döpel, K. Döpel, and Werner Heisenberg Bestimmung der Diffusionslänge thermischer Neutronen in Präparat 38 G-22 (5 December 1940)
 Robert Döpel, K. Döpel, and Werner Heisenberg Versuche mit Schichtenanordnungen von D2O und 38 G-75 (28 October 1941)
 Werner Heisenberg Über die Möglichkeit der Energieerzeugung mit Hilfe des Isotops 238 G-92 (1941)
 Werner Heisenberg Bericht über Versuche mit Schichtenanordnungen von Präparat 38 und Paraffin am Kaiser Wilhelm Institut für Physik in Berlin-Dahlem G-93 (May 1941)
Fritz Bopp, Erich Fischer, Werner Heisenberg, Carl-Friedrich von Weizsäcker, and Karl Wirtz Untersuchungen mit neuen Schichtenanordnungen aus U-metall und Paraffin G-127 (March 1942)
 Robert Döpel Bericht über Unfälle beim Umgang mit Uranmetall G-135 (9 July 1942)
 Werner Heisenberg Bemerkungen zu dem geplanten halbtechnischen Versuch mit 1,5 to D2O und 3 to 38-Metall G-161 (31 July 1942)
 Werner Heisenberg, Fritz Bopp, Erich Fischer, Carl-Friedrich von Weizsäcker, and Karl Wirtz Messungen an Schichtenanordnungen aus 38-Metall und Paraffin G-162 (30 October 1942)
 Robert Döpel, K. Döpel, and Werner Heisenberg Der experimentelle Nachweis der effektiven Neutronenvermehrung in einem Kugel-Schichten-System aus D2O und Uran-Metall G-136 (July 1942)
 Werner Heisenberg Die Energiegewinnung aus der Atomkernspaltung G-217 (6 May 1943)
Fritz Bopp, Walther Bothe, Erich Fischer, Erwin Fünfer, Werner Heisenberg, O. Ritter, and Karl Wirtz Bericht über einen Versuch mit 1.5 to D2O und U und 40 cm Kohlerückstreumantel (B7) G-300 (3 January 1945)
 Robert Döpel, K. Döpel, and Werner Heisenberg Die Neutronenvermehrung in einem D2O-38-Metallschichtensystem G-373 (March 1942)

Other research publications

 The paper was received on 29 July 1925. [English translation in: ] This is the first paper in the famous trilogy which launched the matrix mechanics formulation of quantum mechanics.
 The paper was received on 27 September 1925. [English translation in: ] This is the second paper in the famous trilogy which launched the matrix mechanics formulation of quantum mechanics.
 The paper was received on 16 November 1925. [English translation in: ] This is the third paper in the famous trilogy which launched the matrix mechanics formulation of quantum mechanics.

 The author was cited as being at Leipzig. The paper was received on 21 June 1934.

 The authors were cited as being at Leipzig. The paper was received on 22 December 1935. A translation of this paper has been done by W. Korolevski and H. Kleinert: arXiv:physics/0605038v1.

 

 

 The substance of this article was presented by Heisenberg in a lecture at Harvard University.

Published books

 (full text of 1958 version)

In popular culture
Heisenberg's surname is used as the primary alias for Walter White (played by Bryan Cranston), the lead character in AMC's crime drama series Breaking Bad, throughout White's transformation from a high-school chemistry teacher into a meth cook and a drug kingpin. In the spin-off prequel series Better Call Saul, a character named Werner directs the construction of the meth lab belonging to antagonist Gus Fring that Walt cooks in for much of Breaking Bad.

Werner Heisenberg was the target of an assassination by spy Moe Berg in the film The Catcher Was a Spy, based on real events.

Heisenberg is credited with building the atomic bomb used by the Axis in the Amazon Prime TV series adaptation of the novel The Man in the High Castle by Philip K. Dick. Atomic bombs in this universe are referred to as Heisenberg Devices.

Daniel Craig portrayed Heisenberg in the 2002 film Copenhagen, an adaptation of Michael Frayn's play of that name.

Heisenberg is the namesake of Resident Evil Village secondary antagonist Karl Heisenberg. Heisenberg's research on ferromagnetism served as inspiration for the character's magnetic abilities.

See also

 List of things named after Werner Heisenberg
 List of German inventors and discoverers
 The Physical Principles of the Quantum Theory

References
Footnotes

Citations

Bibliography

 
 See also  
 

 
 
 
 

 The author was cited as being at Leipzig. The paper was received on 21 June 1934.

 The authors were cited as being at Leipzig. The paper was received on 22 December 1935. A translation of this paper has been done by W. Korolevski and H. Kleinert: arXiv:physics/0605038v1.
  [This book is a collection of 121 primary German documents relating to physics under National Socialism. The documents have been translated and annotated, and there is a lengthy introduction to put them into perspective.]

External links

 Annotated Bibliography for Werner Heisenberg from the Alsos Digital Library for Nuclear Issues
 MacTutor Biography: Werner Karl Heisenberg
 Heisenberg/Uncertainty  biographical exhibit by American Institute of Physics.
 Key Participants: Werner Heisenberg – Linus Pauling and the Nature of the Chemical Bond: A Documentary History
 Nobelprize.org biography
 Werner Heisenberg: Atomic Physics Mentorees
 
 
 

 
1901 births
1976 deaths
Scientists from Würzburg
Foreign Members of the Royal Society
German Lutherans
German mountain climbers
German Nobel laureates
Grand Crosses with Star and Sash of the Order of Merit of the Federal Republic of Germany
Werner
Academic staff of the Humboldt University of Berlin
Ludwig Maximilian University of Munich alumni
Max Planck Society people
Members of the Pontifical Academy of Sciences
Members of the Prussian Academy of Sciences
Members of the Royal Netherlands Academy of Arts and Sciences
Foreign associates of the National Academy of Sciences
Nobel laureates in Physics
20th-century German physicists
Nuclear program of Nazi Germany
People from the Kingdom of Bavaria
Philosophers of science
Quantum physicists
Fluid dynamicists
Recipients of the Pour le Mérite (civil class)
Scouting and Guiding in Germany
Theoretical physicists
Academic staff of the University of Göttingen
Academic staff of Leipzig University
Burials at Munich Waldfriedhof
Winners of the Max Planck Medal
Niels Bohr International Gold Medal recipients
Members of the Bavarian Academy of Sciences
Operation Epsilon
People associated with CERN
Members of the German Academy of Sciences at Berlin
Recipients of the Matteucci Medal
Members of the Göttingen Academy of Sciences and Humanities
20th-century Freikorps personnel
Max Planck Institute directors